The Lei Cheng Uk Han Tomb Museum is composed of a brick tomb (E. Han or slightly later) and an exhibition hall adjacent to it. It is located at 41 Tonkin Street, in Cheung Sha Wan, Sham Shui Po District, in the northwestern part of the Kowloon Peninsula of Hong Kong.

History

According to the structure, calligraphy and content of the inscriptions on tomb bricks and to the tomb finds, the tomb is commonly believed to have been built during the Eastern Han dynasty (AD 25 – 220) although the Southern Dynasties period was also suggested. It was probably built for a Chinese officer attached to the local garrison.

The tomb is constructed of bricks (average size 40x20x5cm) and consists of four chambers set in the form of a cross. The dome vault at the center was constructed by laying bricks in a spiral, while the other chambers are barrel vaulted. Some bricks are stamped or carved with inscriptions or patterns on the exposed sides. It is believed that the rear chamber is the coffin chamber, that side chambers were used for storage, while ritual ceremonies were performed in the front chamber under the domed roof.

The tomb's cross-shaped structure and the burial objects found inside show great similarities as compared to other Han tombs found in South China, which prove that early Chinese civilization had spread to Hong Kong 2,000 years ago. The inscription Panyu on tomb bricks further confirms the dating, since, according to historical records, Panyu was the name of the county to which the present territory of Hong Kong belonged during the Han dynasty. Also, the style of the calligraphy used in the inscriptions was an angular version of lishu (clerical script) which was generally used in inscriptions on bronze wares and stones during the Han dynasty. There were no bodies found in the tomb.

Discovery and preservation

The tomb was accidentally discovered in August 1955, when the Hong Kong Government was levelling a hill slope for the construction of resettlement buildings at Lei Cheng Uk Village (present-day Lei Cheng Uk Estate). The tomb was then excavated by members of Hong Kong University and workers of the Public Works Department, Hong Kong under the supervision of Professor F.S. Drake, former head of the Chinese Department at the University of Hong Kong. After excavation, the tomb and an exhibition hall were formally opened to the public in 1957. In November 1988, the Han Tomb was declared as a gazetted monument by the Hong Kong Government, and it is now protected and preserved permanently under the Antiquities and Monuments Ordinance.

Due to conservation reasons, visitors have not been able to enter the tomb itself since the mid-1980s. They now have to view it through a glass panel at the entrance passage, and the tomb is sealed in a temperature and humidity controlled environment.

The tomb, which had been protected by concrete, waterproofing layers, topsoil and turf, suffered from rainwater leakage problems and its protection underwent a renovation project completed in 2005. The renovation works included the building of a canopy to cover the tomb.

3D Laser Scanning Technology in digital recording of structures was applied to capture 3D images of the structure.

The museum

The tomb and gallery came under the management of the former Urban Council in 1969. The museum later became a branch of the Hong Kong Museum of History in 1975. As such, it is managed by the Leisure and Cultural Services Department of the Hong Kong Government. A newly built exhibition hall opened in 1988, when the tomb was declared a gazetted monument. The hall was refurbished in 2005.
Details on the discovery and characteristics of the tomb, as well as bronze and pottery artefacts found in the tomb are on permanent display in the exhibition hall.

A 3D digital animation in the exhibition hall provides a detailed view of the interior of the tomb. Moreover, a 1:1 replica of the inside of the Lei Cheng Uk Han Tomb is displayed at the Hong Kong Museum of History.

Exhibition Hall

The Exhibition Hall is located next to the tomb.
The first section is about food and drink in Han as it seems because most of what was found in the Han tomb is related to food. The display of this section begins with the old Chinese adage, 'food is the first necessity of the people'. There is a map depicting food distribution, a pictogram of rice distribution and a table of the major food groups. There are also three replicas of figurines. Two of the figurines are cooks, and another one is a farmer.

The second section is about the excavation of the Han tomb. The excavation process, the inside of the tomb and the archaeologists at work are shown with several photographs. The tomb's structure and layout are shown with the models and plans. This displays also how the professionals dated the tomb by using the inscriptions on the bricks.

The third part of the gallery shows the artefacts found in the tomb. As the only Eastern Han dynasty brick tomb ever found in Hong Kong, the Lei Cheng Uk Han Tomb has invaluable historic value containing 58 items found on site. Objects include cooking utensils, food containers, storage jars and models (a house, a granary, a well and a stove) made of pottery (50), as well as bowls, basins, mirrors, and bells made of bronze (8). No human skeletal remains were found.

Transportation
The Lei Cheng Uk Han Tomb Museum is served by the Cheung Sha Wan MTR station (exit A3).

Surrounding
The Han Garden, located next to the museum, was completed in December 1993. The features in this Chinese garden were built following the style of the Han dynasty and include pavilions, terraces, towers, fishponds and rock sculptures.

Once overlooking the seashore, the site of the tomb is now almost 2,000 m from the sea, following a series of land reclamations.

See also
List of museums in Hong Kong
Declared monuments of Hong Kong
Museum of the Mausoleum of the Nanyue King, in Guangzhou

References

Further reading
 Jao Tsung-yi. 1969. Commentaries to the inscriptions on bricks of the ancient tomb at Li-cheng-uk village, Kowloon. Bulletin of the Institute of History and Philology. Academia Sinica (Taipei). Vol. XXXIX, Pt. 1.
 Watt, James C.Y. 1970. A Han Tomb in Lei Cheng Uk. City Museum and Art Gallery, Hong Kong.
 Lo Hsiang-lin. 1975. The discovery of a Han tomb in Lei Cheng Uk village, Hong Kong, and the objects found therein. Bulletin of the Dept. of Archaeology and Anthropology (National Taiwan University). Vols. 37–38 (1971), pages 68–83 and plates I-XVII
 Meacham, William. 1980. Photographs and a field note of the 1955 excavation at Lei Cheng Uk. Journal of the Hong Kong Archaeological Society. Vol. VIII, pp. 129–133.

External links

Museum website 
Deformation survey for the preservation of Lei Cheng Uk Han Tomb

Archaeological museums in China
History museums in Hong Kong
Declared monuments of Hong Kong
Archaeological sites in Hong Kong
History of Hong Kong
Mausoleums in China
Cheung Sha Wan
Subterranean Hong Kong
Han dynasty
1955 archaeological discoveries